Suli Darreh (also Romanized as Sūlī Darreh, Solū Darreh, Sūlīdareh, and Suli-Darrekh) is a village in Dodangeh-ye Olya Rural District, Ziaabad District, Takestan County, Qazvin Province, Iran. At the 2006 census, its population was 42, in 13 families.

References 

Populated places in Takestan County